In Africa, the Big Five game animals are the lion, leopard, black rhinoceros, African bush elephant, and African buffalo. They are examples of charismatic megafauna, featuring prominently in popular culture, and are among the most famous of Africa's large animals. The term was coined by big-game hunters, and refers to the five most difficult animals in Africa to hunt on foot but is now more widely used by game viewing tourists and safari tour operators.

The 1990 and later releases of South African rand banknotes feature a different big-five animal on each denomination. Countries where all can be found include Angola, Botswana, Eswatini, Kenya, Malawi, Mozambique, Namibia, Rwanda, South Africa, Tanzania, Uganda, the Democratic Republic of the Congo, Zambia and Zimbabwe.

Species

Elephant

The African bush elephant (Loxodonta africana) and African forest elephant (Loxodonta cyclotis) are the largest land-based animals. Elephants are herbivores with thick, almost hairless skin; a long, flexible, prehensile trunk; upper incisors forming long, curved, ivory tusks; and large, fan-shaped ears. Elephants are difficult to hunt because, despite their large size, they are able to hide in thick bush and are more likely to charge than the other Big Five species. They become aggressive when their young are threatened.

Rhinoceros

The black rhinoceros (Diceros bicornis) and white rhinoceros (Ceratotherium simum) are large herbivores with two upright horns on their nasal bridge. The black rhino is classified as critically endangered and the white rhino as near threatened, and both are subject to extensive poaching. Among big-five game hunters, the black rhinoceros is more highly prized.

African buffalo

The African buffalo (Syncerus caffer) is a large horned bovid. It is the only animal among the Big Five that is not on the "endangered" or "threatened" list. The Cape buffalo (Syncerus caffer caffer) is considered by many to be the most dangerous of any of the Big Five: buffalos have reportedly been known to ambush and attack humans.

Lion

The lion (Panthera leo) is a large, carnivorous feline found in Africa and northwest India. It has a short, tawny coat; a tufted tail; and, in the male, a heavy mane around the neck and shoulders. As a large and charismatic apex predator, lions are among the most popular species to view on safari tours.

Leopard

The leopard (Panthera pardus) is a large, carnivorous feline. Its fur is generally tawny with dark rosette-shaped markings. The leopard is the most seldom seen of the Big Five because of its nocturnal habits (it is most active between sunset and sunrise, although it may hunt during the day in some areas), and because it is wary of humans and will take flight in the face of danger. Leopards can be found in the savanna grasslands, brush land and forested areas in Africa. Among the Big Five, they are the most difficult animals to acquire a hunting license for.

Conservation status
Africa's Big Five have become major concerns for wildlife conservationists in recent years. The African lion and African leopard are both classified as vulnerable. The African savanna elephant is listed as endangered by the IUCN as of 2021. The southern white rhinoceros and African buffalo are classified as near threatened while the black rhinoceros is classified as critically endangered.

See also
 Charismatic megafauna
 Little five game

References

External links

 20 Incredible African Safari Animals & Where to See Them

 Weight, diet, life span and other lifestyle details of the Big Five

.
Hunting
Tourism in Africa
5 (number)